If This Is Hell, Then I'm Lucky is the debut album by Deadboy & the Elephantmen, fronted by Dax Riggs, formerly of Acid Bath and Agents of Oblivion. The album was re-released on February 5, 2008 under Dax Riggs's name only, and again in 2010 by Rotten Records, using the band's proper title. It features Dax Riggs (vocals, guitar), Jason Dupre (guitar), Christopher T. Gautreaux (bass guitar), Jeff LeCompte (drums, percussion), and Kurt Westwood (piano, synths).

Track listings

Album
 "Strange Television" (6:14)
 "Waking Up Insane" (4:30)
 "Song with No Name" (4:03)
 "Graves Beyond Windows" (3:51)
 "Otherworldly Dreamer" (7:50)
 "Like the Dead Would Laugh" (5:07)
 "High Monster" (4:42)
 "Heart of Green" (8:16)
 "Barefoot in the Dark" (4:20)
 "Deadboy and the Elephantmen Theme Song" (7:53)

Demo
 "Barefoot in the Dark" (3:34)
 "Waking Up Insane" (4:55)
 "Strange Television" (5:52)
 "Heart of Green" (6:37)
 "Song with No Name" (3:45)
 "Otherworldly Dreamer" (3:20)
 "Graves Beyond Windows" (4:29)
 "Deadboy and the Elephantmen Theme Song" (2:16)

References

Dax Riggs albums
2002 albums
Deadboy & the Elephantmen albums